The Archdiocese of Edmonton is a Latin Church ecclesiastical territory or archdiocese in the Canadian civil province of Alberta. The archbishop's cathedral see is located in St. Joseph Cathedral, a minor basilica in Edmonton. The Archdiocese of Edmonton is the metropolitan see of its ecclesiastical province, which also contains two suffragan dioceses: the Dioceses of Calgary and Saint Paul in Alberta.

On March 22, 2007, Vatican Information Services announced that a Halifax native, Bishop Richard William Smith of the Roman Catholic Diocese of Pembroke, Canada, had been appointed as Archbishop of Edmonton by Pope Benedict XVI. On Saturday, July 14, 2012, an official news release from Vatican Information Service (VIS), an arm of the Holy See Press Office, stated that Pope Benedict XVI had appointed Gregory Bittman, who until then had been serving as the Judicial Vicar and as Archdiocesan Chancellor, as an Auxiliary Bishop of the Archdiocese of Edmonton and Titular Bishop of Caltadria.

Ecclesiastical province 
Its suffragan sees are : 
 Roman Catholic Diocese of Calgary 
 Roman Catholic Diocese of Saint Paul, Alberta

History 
Established on 22 September 1871 as the Diocese of St Albert (Latin Sancti Alberti), on territory split off from the then Diocese of Saint-Boniface, to which it lost territory again in 1889 (meanwhile Metropolitan Archdiocese of Saint-Boniface)

Promoted on 1912.11.30 as Metropolitan Archdiocese of Edmonton / Edmontonen(sis) (Latin), having lost territory to establish the Roman Catholic Diocese of Calgary as its first suffragan.

Lost territory again on 1948.07.17 to establish the Roman Catholic Diocese of Saint Paul, Alberta, which became its second suffragan.

It enjoyed a Papal visit from Pope John Paul II in September 1984.

The Archdiocese of Edmonton was later criticized for its handling of sex abuse allegations against Rev. Patrick O'Neill and was sued by one of O'Neil's alleged victims in 2012.

Diocesan episcopate 
(all Roman rite)

Suffragan Bishops of Edmonton
 Vital-Justin Grandin, Missionary Oblates of Mary Immaculate (O.M.I.) (1871.09.22 – death 1902.06.03), previously Titular Bishop of Satala (1857.12.11 – 1871.09.22) as Coadjutor Bishop of Saint-Boniface (Canada) (1857.12.11 – 1871.09.22)
 Émile-Joseph Legal, O.M.I. (1902.06.03 – see promoted 1912.11.30 see below), succeeding as previous Coadjutor Bishop of Saint Albert (1897.03.29 – 1902.06.03) and Titular Bishop of Pogla (1897.03.29 – 1902.06.03)

Metropolitan Archbishops of Edmonton
 Émile-Joseph Legal, O.M.I. (see above 1912.11.30 – death 1920.03.10)
 Henry Joseph O'Leary, (1920.09.07 – death 1938.03.05), previously Bishop of Charlottetown (Canada) (1913.01.29 – 1920.09.07)
 John Hugh MacDonald, (1938.03.05 – retired 1964.08.11), previously ; later Bishop of Victoria (Canada) (1934.08.11 – 1936.12.16) and Titular Archbishop of Mocissus (1936.12.16 – 1938.03.05) as Coadjutor Archbishop of Edmonton (1936.12.16 – succession 1938.03.05); emeritate as Titular Archbishop of Mediana (1964.08.11 – death 1965.01.17)
 Anthony Jordan, O.M.I. (1964.08.11 – retired 1973.07.02), previously Titular Bishop of Vada (1945.06.22 – 1955.04.27) as Apostolic Vicar of Prince Rupert (Canada) (1945.06.22 – 1955.04.27), then Titular Archbishop of Silyum (1955.04.27 – 1964.08.11) as Coadjutor Archbishop of Edmonton (1955.04.27 – succession 1964.08.11); died 1982
 Joseph MacNeil, (1973.07.02 – retired 1999.06.07), also President of Canadian Conference of Catholic Bishops (1979 – 1981); previously Bishop of Saint John, New Brunswick (Canada) (1969.04.09 – 1973.07.02)
 Thomas Collins (1999.06.07 – 2006.12.16), also Apostolic Administrator of suffragan Saint Paul (Canada) (2001.03.16 – 2001.09.08); previously Coadjutor Bishop of Saint-Paul (1997.03.25 – 1997.06.30) succeeding as Bishop of Saint-Paul (Canada) (1997.06.30 – 1999.02.18), Coadjutor Archbishop of Edmonton (1999.02.18 – 1999.06.07); later Metropolitan Archbishop of Toronto (Ontario, Canada) (2006.12.16 – ...), created Cardinal-Priest of S. Patrizio (2012.02.18 [2012.10.23] – ...), Member of Commission of Cardinals overseeing the Institute for Works of Religion (2014.01.15 – ...)
 Richard William Smith, ( 2007– ...)

Coadjutor bishops
 John Hugh MacDonald (1936-1938)
 Thomas Collins (1999), future cardinal

Auxiliary bishop
Gregory John Bittman (2012-2018), later appointed Bishop of Nelson, British Columbia

Other priests of this diocese who became bishops
 James Charles McGuigan, appointed Archbishop of Regina in 1930; future Cardinal
 Charles Leo Nelligan, appointed Bishop of Pembroke, Ontario in 1937
 Edward Quentin Jennings, appointed Auxiliary Bishop of Vancouver, British Columbia in 1941
 Michael Cornelius O'Neill, appointed Archbishop of Regina in 1947
 Wilfrid Emmett Doyle, appointed Bishop of Nelson, British Columbia in 1958
 Paul Terrio, appointed Bishop of Saint Paul in Alberta in 2012
 Stephen Andrew Hero, appointed Bishop of Prince Albert in 2021

Statistics and extent 
The archdiocese (not including its suffragan dioceses) covers Central Alberta, Edmonton Capital Region and the middle and upper half of the Alberta's Rockies region. The Archdiocese includes the greater Edmonton area but also covers a geographic region stretching from the Rocky Mountains in the west to the Saskatchewan boundary in the east, from Olds in the south to Grande Cache in the north.

It acknowledges that the Archdiocese is situated on traditional lands, parts of which are within Treaty 6, Treaty 7 and Treaty 8 territories of the Alexander First Nation (Cree), Alexis Nakota Sioux Nation (Stoney), Enoch Cree Nation (Cree), Ermineskin Cree Nation (Cree), Louis Bull Tribe (Cree),  Montana First Nation (Cree),  O’Chiese First Nation (Western Ojibwa), Paul First Nation (Cree/Stoney),  Samson Cree Nation (Cree), and Sunchild First Nation (Cree). Mass is celebrated in at least 16 different languages, including Cree, French, Spanish, Polish, Chinese, Croatian, Portuguese, Vietnamese, Italian, Hungarian, Korean, Latin, Sudanese, and American Sign Language.

As of 2020, it pastorally served 436,792 Catholics (26.4% of 1,899,097 total) on 150,000 km² in 122 parishes and missions with 126 priests, 40 permanent deacons, 163 religious sisters, 8 religious brothers, 5 members of lay institutes, 15 lay missionaries and 12 seminarians.

Edmonton parishes 

Annunciation
Assumption
Good Shepherd
Holy Rosary (Polish)
Holy Spirit
Mary Help of Christians (Chinese)
Nativity of Mary (Croatian)
Our Lady of Fatima (Portuguese)
Our Lady of Good Help, Maronite Catholic Community
Our Lady of Guadalupe (Spanish)
Our Lady of Loretto (Military)
Our Lady Queen of Poland (Polish)
Queen of Martyrs (Vietnamese)
Sacred Heart Church of the First Peoples

St. Agnes
St. Alphonsus
St. Andrew
St. Angela Merici
St. Anne (French) (merged with St. Joachim as of October 2014)
St. Anthony
St. Charles
St. Clare
St. Dominic Savio
St. Edmund
St. Emeric (Hungarian)
St. Joachim (French)
St. John Bosco

St. John the Evangelist
St. Joseph's Basilica
St. Joseph's College Chapel
St. Jung Ha Sang (Korean)
St. Maria Goretti (Italian)
St. Mark's Catholic Community of the Deaf
St. Matthew
St. Michael - Resurrection
St. Theresa
St. Thomas d'Aquin
St. Thomas More

Rural parishes 

Alberta Beach
Lac Ste. Anne
Bashaw
Immaculate Heart of Mary
Beaumont
St. Vital
Camrose
St. Francis Xavier
Devon
St. Maria Goretti
Drayton Valley
St. Anthony
Edson
Sacred Heart
Enoch
Our Lady of Mercy
St. Alexander Mission
Evansburg
St. Elizabeth
Fort Saskatchewan
Our Lady of the Angels
Gibbons
Sacred Heart
Grande Cache
Holy Cross
Hinton
Our Lady of the Foothills

Innisfail
Our Lady of Peace
Jasper
Our Lady of Lourdes
Killam
Killiam-Daysland-Heisler
Lacombe
St. Stephen
Leduc
Our Lady of Victory
St. Michael
Lloydminster
St. Anthony
Ma-Me-O-Beach
St. Theresa
Maskwacis
Our Lady of Seven Sorrows
Mayerthorpe
St. Agnes
Onoway
St. Rose of Lima
Olds
St. Stephen
Ponoka
St. Augustine
Provost
St. Mary
Red Deer
Sacred Heart
St. Mary's

Rocky Mountain House
St. Matthew
Rimbey
St. Margaret
St. Albert
Holy Family
St. Albert Francophone Community
St. Albert
St. Peter, Villeneuve
Stettler
Christ - King
Spruce Grove
Holy Trinity
Sherwood Park
Our Lady of Perpetual Help
Sylvan Lake
Our Lady of the Assumption
Trochu
St. Anne of the Prairies
Wetaskiwin
Sacred Heart
Wainwright
Blessed Sacrament
Vermilion
Holy Name of Jesus
Vegreville
St. Martin of Tours

Archdiocesan Media 
The Western Catholic Reporter was a weekly newspaper published in Edmonton, Alberta, Canada that covered the Catholic religion.
 
The newspaper was owned by the Roman Catholic Archdiocese of Edmonton. Its declared mission was to serve its readers by helping them deepen their faith through accurate information and reflective commentary on events and issues of concern to the Church.

The Reporter closed in 2016 and was replaced by the news website Grandin Media.

References

Sources and external links

 The Catholic Archdiocese of Edmonton home page
 Gcatholic with Google map and - satellite photo
  Archdiocese of Edmonton page at catholichierarchy.org  retrieved July 13, 2006
 Western Catholic Reporter
 Grandin Media

 
Religious sees in Edmonton